Brin is a Genoa Metro station. It is situated along Via Benedetto Brin in the neighbourhood of Certosa in Rivarolo Ligure, a suburban area in the north-western outskirts of Genoa, Italy. The station, currently the terminus of the line, is located just west of the outlet of the tunnel from Dinegro station. It is built on a viaduct, designed to extend the line to the north, towards a new station. It is the only station above ground.

Designed by architect Renzo Piano, the station's official opening took place on 13 June 1990, and along with Dinegro became one of the first operational stations.

References

External links

Genoa Metro stations
Railway stations opened in 1990
1990 establishments in Italy
Renzo Piano buildings
Rivarolo Ligure
Railway stations in Italy opened in the 20th century